Anna Green (born 20 August 1990), is an association footballer who plays for Sydney FC and represents New Zealand at international level. She has also played for Three Kings United (ASB League), Adelaide United and Lokomotive Leipzig (Bundesliga).

In January 2014 Green agreed a transfer to Notts County of the FA WSL. Under the terms of the deal she would join the English club after finishing the Australian season with Sydney FC and taking part in the Cyprus Cup. After seeing out her contract with Reading, Green decided to return to New Zealand and play part-time in the National Women's League while working as an accountant.

International career
Green made her international debut as a substitute in a 0–3 loss to China on 14 November 2006. She was included in the New Zealand squad for the 2008 Summer Olympics, featuring in the losses to Norway (0–1) and Brazil (0–4).

Green travelled with the New Zealand U-20 squad to the 2008 Women's U-20 World Cup finals in Chile, again featuring in two of New Zealand's group games. In 2010, she represented New Zealand at the 2010 FIFA U-20 Women's World Cup in Germany, appearing in all three group games. She was also part of the squad at the 2015 FIFA Women's World Cup in Canada.

References

External links
 
 Profile at NZF
 

1990 births
Living people
New Zealand women's association footballers
Sydney FC (A-League Women) players
Notts County L.F.C. players
Olympic association footballers of New Zealand
Footballers at the 2008 Summer Olympics
Footballers at the 2012 Summer Olympics
2011 FIFA Women's World Cup players
2015 FIFA Women's World Cup players
Footballers from Stockport
New Zealand women's international footballers
Footballers at the 2016 Summer Olympics
New Zealand expatriate sportspeople in England
Expatriate women's footballers in England
New Zealand expatriate sportspeople in Australia
Expatriate women's soccer players in Australia
Expatriate women's footballers in Germany
New Zealand expatriate sportspeople in Germany
Women's association football defenders
Expatriate women's footballers in Sweden
Damallsvenskan players
Reading F.C. Women players
Mallbackens IF players
2019 FIFA Women's World Cup players
Footballers at the 2020 Summer Olympics
New Zealand expatriate sportspeople in Sweden
New Zealand expatriate women's association footballers